KQOV-LP (98.5 FM) is a radio station broadcasting a religious broadcasting format. Licensed to Butte, Montana, United States, the station serves the Butte area.  The station is currently owned by Queen of Victory Educational Radio Association.

References

External links
 

Catholic radio stations
QOV-LP
QOV-LP
Radio stations established in 2005
2005 establishments in Montana
QOV-LP
Catholic Church in Montana